Leedom is a surname. Notable people with the surname include:

 Boyd Leedom (1906–1969), American judge
 Edna Leedom (1896–1937), American actress
 Joanne Leedom-Ackerman, American novelist
 John P. Leedom (1847–1895), American politician

See also
 Leedom Estates, Pennsylvania
 David Leedom Farm